Agnete Maria Forfang Kjølsrud (born 1 December 1976) is a Norwegian rock singer. She has been the lead vocalist of the hard rock band Djerv since 2009.

Kjølsrud previously fronted the alternative metal band Animal Alpha between 2002 and 2009. She appeared on the two albums released by the band, Pheromones (2005) and You Pay for the Whole Seat, But You'll Only Need the Edge (2008). Kjølsrud also collaborated with Dimmu Borgir on their studio album titled Abrahadabra and Solefald on their studio album titled Norrøn livskunst. 

In 2013, she sang "Get Jinxed" for the video game League of Legends; its music video has over 100 million views on YouTube.

References

External links
 

1976 births
Living people
21st-century Norwegian singers
Norwegian women singers
Norwegian rock singers
21st-century Norwegian women singers